"Maggie May" is a song co-written by singer Rod Stewart and Martin Quittenton, and performed by Rod Stewart on his album Every Picture Tells a Story, released in 1971.

In 2004, Rolling Stone ranked the song number 130 on its list of The 500 Greatest Songs of All Time.

Background
"Maggie May" expresses the ambivalence and contradictory emotions of a boy involved in a relationship with an older woman and was written from Stewart's own experience. In the January 2007 issue of Q magazine, Stewart recalled: "Maggie May was more or less a true story, about the first woman I had sex with, at the 1961 Beaulieu Jazz Festival." The woman's name was not "Maggie May"; Stewart has stated that the name was taken from "an old Liverpudlian song about a prostitute."

The song was recorded in just two takes in one session. Drummer Micky Waller often arrived at recording sessions with the expectation that a drum kit would be provided and, for "Maggie May", it was – except that no cymbals could be found. The cymbal crashes had to be overdubbed separately some days later.

The song was released as the B-side of the single "Reason to Believe", but soon radio stations began playing the B-side and "Maggie May" became the more popular side. The song was Stewart's first substantial hit as a solo performer and launched his solo career. It remains one of his best-known songs. A 1971 performance of the song on Top of the Pops saw the Faces joined onstage by DJ John Peel, who pretended to play the mandolin.   The mandolin player on the actual recording was Ray Jackson of Lindisfarne.

The album version of "Maggie May" incorporates a 30-second solo guitar intro, "Henry", composed by Martin Quittenton.

The original recording has appeared on almost all of Rod Stewart's compilations, and even appeared on the Ronnie Wood retrospective Ronnie Wood Anthology: The Essential Crossexion. A version by the Faces recorded for BBC Radio appeared on the four-disc box set Five Guys Walk into a Bar.... A live version recorded in 1993 by Stewart joined by Wood for a session of MTV Unplugged is included on the album Unplugged...and Seated.

Chart performance
In October 1971, the song went to number one on the UK Singles Chart (for five weeks), and simultaneously topped the charts in Australia (four weeks), Canada (one week), and the United States (six weeks). It was the No. 2 record for 1971 on both the US Billboard Hot 100 and UK singles charts.

The song re-entered the UK chart in December 1976, but only reached number 31.

Weekly charts

Year-end charts

All-time charts

Certifications

Personnel
 Rod Stewart – lead vocals
 Ronnie Wood – electric guitar, twelve-string guitar, bass guitar
 Martin Quittenton – acoustic guitar
 Micky Waller – drums, cymbals
 Ian McLagan – Hammond organ
 Ray Jackson – mandolin (listed on the album as "The mandolin was played by the mandolin player in Lindisfarne. The name slips my mind.")
 Pete Sears – celesta

See also
 Maggie May (folk song)

References

External links
 
 

1971 singles
Billboard Hot 100 number-one singles
Cashbox number-one singles
Number-one singles in Australia
Rod Stewart songs
Song recordings produced by Rod Stewart
Songs written by Martin Quittenton
Songs written by Rod Stewart
The Pogues songs
UK Singles Chart number-one singles
RPM Top Singles number-one singles
1971 songs
Mercury Records singles
British folk rock songs
Sexuality and age in fiction